Chembil Ashokan is an actor in the Malayalam film industry. He is from Chembu - Vaikom. He has played many notable characters in Malayalam cinema.

Filmography

Television 
Kadamattathu Kathanar (JaiHind TV)
Bhasi Bahadoor (Mazhavil Manorama)

References

Male actors in Malayalam cinema
Indian male film actors
Male actors from Kottayam
Living people
21st-century Indian male actors
People from Vaikom
1960 births